Kaitouly (also, Kaitouli, Qaytouli. Arabic:" قيتولي" مصيف الآلهة which means "gods residence" in the Syriac language is a village in the Jezzine District of South Governorate in Lebanon. Kaitouly is about 72 km from the capital Beirut.

Monuments 
Monuments in Kaitouly include Mar Mikhael (Saint Michael) ancient church (built around 1811), heritage houses, an old press, ruins of an old press, and that of old mills.

Natural attractions 
A visitor to the area can find human traces in the nature such as coal quarries and mines, and purely natural spots including the Mar Gergess (Saint George) spring, the Al-Houwwa (Arabic for pit) in the area of Dahr Al-Makla'a, and the pine woods dispersed around the village.

Notable figures 
The Lebanese Poet Ounsi el-Hajj was born in Kaitouly

Developmental projects 
Of the developmental projects that are helping Kaitouly: 
 The UNDP GEF Carob Project
 The Baladi Program chocolate production workshop funded by the USAID

Geology 
From a geological point of view, the land of Kaitouly is principally made of sediments that originate from the event of the formation of the Mount Lebanon where parts of the crust was raised from below the Mediterranean Sea to elevations reaching 3,088 m at the Qurnat as Sawda'.

See also 
 List of municipalities of Lebanon

References

External links 
  Qaytouli, localiban
    

Populated places in Jezzine District
Maronite Christian communities in Lebanon
Melkite Christian communities in Lebanon